According to the 2012 U.S. Global Leadership Report, 38% of Hungarians approve of U.S. leadership, with 20% disapproving and 42% uncertain, a decrease from 53% approval in 2011. According to a 2018 poll, 68% of Hungarians view the United States favorably.

History 

Until 1867 the Kingdom of Hungary was a part of the Austrian Empire and from 1867 to 1918 of the dual monarchy of Austria-Hungary. United States diplomatic relations with Hungary were conducted through the United States Ambassador to Austria in Vienna. After the dissolution of the Austro-Hungarian Empire following World War I, Hungary and the United States established bilateral relations through a legation in Budapest established in 1921. The first American ambassador to Hungary (Theodore Brentano) was appointed on February 10, 1922.

Diplomatic relations were interrupted during World War II. Hungary severed relations with the U.S. on December 11, 1941, when the United States declared war on Germany. Two days later, on December 13, Hungary declared war on the United States. On June 5, 1942, the United States declared war on Hungary. The US declared war on Romania and Bulgaria the same day. The declaration of war passed both houses of Congress unanimously, by votes of 361–0 in the House of Representatives and 73–0 in the Senate. Normal bilateral relations between Hungary and the U.S. were resumed in December 1945 when a U.S. ambassador was appointed and the embassy was reopened.

Relations between the United States and Hungary following World War II were affected by the Soviet armed forces' occupation of Hungary. Full diplomatic relations were established at the legation level on October 12, 1945, before the signing of the Hungarian peace treaty on February 10, 1947. After the communist takeover in 1947–48, relations with the People's Republic of Hungary became increasingly strained by the nationalization of U.S.-owned property and what the United States considered unacceptable treatment of U.S. citizens and personnel, as well as restrictions on the operations of the American legation. Though relations deteriorated further after the suppression of the Hungarian Revolution of 1956, an exchange of ambassadors in 1966 inaugurated an era of improving relations. In 1972, a consular convention was concluded to provide consular protection to U.S. citizens in Hungary.

In 1973, a bilateral agreement was reached under which Hungary settled the nationalization claims of American citizens. On 6 January 1978, the United States returned the Holy Crown of Hungary, which had been safeguarded by the United States since the end of World War II. Symbolically and actually, this event marked the beginning of excellent relations between the two countries. A 1978 bilateral trade agreement included extension of most-favored-nation status to Hungary. Cultural and scientific exchanges were expanded. As Hungary began to pull away from the Soviet orbit, the United States offered assistance and expertise to help establish a constitution, a democratic political system, and a plan for a free market economy.

Between 1989 and 1993, the Support for East European Democracy (SEED) Act provided more than $136 million for economic restructuring and private-sector development. The Hungarian-American Enterprise Fund has offered loans, equity capital, and technical assistance to promote private-sector development. The U.S. Government has provided expert and financial assistance for the development of modern and Western institutions in many policy areas, including national security, law enforcement, free media, environmental regulations, education, and health care. American direct investment has had a direct, positive impact on the Hungarian economy and on continued good bilateral relations. When Hungary acceded to NATO in April 1999, it became a formal ally of the United States. This move has been consistently supported by the 1.5 million-strong Hungarian-American community. The U.S. government supported Hungarian accession to the European Union in 2004, and continues to work with Hungary as a valued partner in the Transatlantic relationship.
Hungary joined the Visa Waiver Program in 2008.

High-level mutual visits

Resident diplomatic missions
of Hungary in the United States
 Embassy (1): Washington, D.C.
 Consulate General (3): Chicago, Los Angeles, New York City
 Vice-Consulates (2): Houston, Miami
 Honorary Consulate General (1): Atlanta
 Consulate Honorary (16): Boston, Cleveland, Denver, Hampden, Honolulu, Mayagüez, Mercer Island, New Orleans, Portland, Sacramento, St. Louis, St. Louis Park, Salt Lake City, San Francisco, Sarasota, Charlotte

of the United States in Hungary
 Embassy (1): Budapest

Sister-Twinning cities

See also 
 Hungarian Americans
 Hungarian Ambassador to the United States
 United States Ambassador to Hungary
 Foreign relations of the United States
 Foreign relations of Hungary
 United States–European Union relations

References

Further reading

 Bártfai, Imre, "Hungary & the U.S.: Will there be a New Direction for American Diplomacy?", IndraStra Global (2017) 3, ISSN 2381-3652 online

 Borhi, László. "The United States and Hungary, 1956–1990." in Human Rights and Political Dissent in Central Europe (Routledge, 2021) pp. 187-201.
 Frank, Tibor. Ethnicity, Propaganda, Myth-Making: Studies in Hungarian Connections to Britain and America, 1848–1945 (Budapest, Akadémiai Kiadó, 1999).
Frank, Tibor. "Friend or foe? The changing image of Hungary in the United-States." Hungarian Quarterly 38.148 (1997): 116-124.
 Frank, Tibor. Double Exile: Migration of Jewish-Hungarian Professionals Through Germany to the United States, 1919-1945 (2009)
 Frank, Tibor. Genius in Exile: Professional Immigration from Interwar Hungary to the United States (2006).
 Glant, Tibor, "Ninety Years of United States-Hungarian Relations," Eger Journal of American Studies, 13 (2012), 163–83.
 Glant, Tibor, "The Myth and History of Woodrow Wilson's Fourteen Points in Hungary," Eger Journal of American Studies (Eger), 12 (2010), 301–22.
 Glant, Tibor, "Herbert Hoover and Hungary, 1918-1923" Hungarian Journal of English and American Studies (HJEAS) 8#2 (2002), pp. 95–109 online
 Horcicka, Václav, "Austria-Hungary, Unrestricted Submarine Warfare, and the United States' Entrance into the First World War," International History Review (Burnaby), 34 (June 2012), 245–69.
 Kurucz, Milan. "Hungary-United States Relations under Obama and Trump Administration." Politické vedy 23.2 (2020): 98-113.

 Lévai, Csaba, "Henry Clay and Lajos Kossuth's Visit in the United States, 1851–1852," Eger Journal of American Studies (Eger), 13 (2012), pp 219–41.
Pastor, Peter. Hungary between Wilson and Lenin: The Hungarian Revolution of 1918-1919 and the Big Three (1976)

 Peterecz, Zoltán. "Royall Tyler in Hungary: An American of the League of Nations and Hungarian Reconstruction Efforts, 1924–1938." Hungarian Journal of English and American Studies 27.1 (2021) online.
 Peterecz, Zoltán, "'A Certain Amount of Tactful Undermining': Herbert C. Pell and Hungary in 1941," The Hungarian Quarterly (Budapest), 52 (Spring–Summer 2011), pp 124–37.
Peterecz, Zoltán, "American Foreign Policy and American Financial Controllers in Europe in the 1920s," Hungarian Journal of English and American Studies (Debrecen), 18 (2012), pp 457–85.
 Peterecz, Zoltán, "Money Has No Smell: Anti-Semitism in Hungary and the Anglo-Saxon World, and the Launching of the International Reconstruction Loan for Hungary in 1924," Eger Journal of American Studies (Eger), 13 (2012), pp 273–90.
 Peterecz, Zoltán, "The Fight for a Yankee over Here: Attempts to Secure an American for an Official League of Nations Post in the Postwar Central European Financial Reconstruction Era of the 1920s," Eger Journal of American Studies (Eger), 12 (2010), pp 465–88.
 Puskas, Julianna. Ties That Bind, Ties That Divide. One Hundred Years of Hungarian Experience in the United States (Holmes and Meier, 2000), 465 pp.
 Romsics, Ignác, ed. Twentieth Century Hungary and the Great Powers (Boulder: East European Monographs, 1996).
 
 Várdy, Steven Béla, and Thomas Szendrey. "Hungarian Americans." Gale Encyclopedia of Multicultural America, edited by Thomas Riggs, (3rd ed., vol. 2, Gale, 2014), pp. 373–386. Online
Várdy, Steven Béla and Agnes Huszar Vardy, eds. Hungarian Americans in the Current of History (2010), essays by scholars; online review
 Vida, István Kornél. Hungarian Émigrés in the American Civil War: A History and Biographical Dictionary (McFarland, 2012) 256 pp.
 Zsolt, Péter, Tamás Tóth, and Márton Demeter. "We are the ones who matter! Pro and anti-Trumpists’ attitudes in Hungary." Journal of Contemporary European Studies (2021): 1-19 online.

Cold War 1945-1989

 Bischof, Günter. "United States Responses to the Soviet Suppression of Rebellions in the German Democratic Republic, Hungary, and Czechoslovakia." Diplomacy & Statecraft 22.1 (2011): 61-80.
 Borhi, László. "Rollback, Liberation, Containment, or Inaction? U.S. Policy and Eastern Europe in the 1950s." Journal of Cold War Studies 1.3 (1999): 67-110. online
 Borhi, László. "From the Prehistory of the Cold War (Hungary and the United States 1944–49)." Acta Historica Academiae Scientiarum Hungaricae 35.1/4 (1989): 217-249. online
 Borhi, László. "‘We Hungarian communists are realists’: János Kádár's foreign policy in the light of Hungarian–US relations, 1957–67." Cold War History 4.2 (2004): 1-32.
 Borhi, László. "In the Power Arena: U.S.-Hungarian Relations, 1942–1989," The Hungarian Quarterly (Budapest), 51 (Summer 2010), pp 67–81.
 Borhi, László. "Dealing with dictatorship: The US and Hungary during the early kádár years." Hungarian Studies 27.1 (2013): 15-66. online
 Borhi, László. Hungary in the Cold War, 1945-1956: Between the United States and the Soviet Union (2004) online
 Gati, Charles. Hungary and the Soviet Bloc (Duke University Press, 1986).
 Glant, Tibor. Remember Hungary 1956: Essays on the Hungarian Revolution and Wars of Independence in American Memory (2007) online review
 Granville, Johanna. "Radio Free Europe’s Impact on the Kremlin in the Hungarian Crisis of 1956: Three Hypotheses." Canadian Journal of History 39.3 (2004): 515-546.
 Holloway, David, and Victor McFarland. "The Hungarian Revolution of 1956 in the Context of the Cold War Military Confrontation." Hungarian Studies 20.1 (2006): 31-49. online
 Jarvis, Eric. "The Creation of a Controversial Anti‐Communist Martyr in Early Cold War America: Reactions to the Arrest and Show Trial of Cardinal Joseph Mindszenty of Hungary, 1948–1949." Historian 78.2 (2016): 277-308.
 Max, Stanley. The Anglo-American Response to the Sovietization of Hungary, 1945– 1948 (Michigan: University of Michigan Press, 1990).
 Radvanyi, Janos. Hungary and the Superpowers, The 1956 Revolution and Realpolitik (Stanford University Press, 1972).
 Webb, Alban. "Cold War Radio and the Hungarian Uprising, 1956." Cold War History 13.2 (2013): 221-238.

External links
 History of Hungary - U.S. relations

 
Bilateral relations of the United States
United States